James Andrew Olds (born 20 February 1986) is an Australian bass. He holds a Masters of Music in Performance (Voice & Opera) from the Guildhall School of Music and Drama, London, and currently performs with Opera Australia at the Sydney Opera House.

Biography
In 2016, Olds made his debut as a principal artist with Opera Australia performing the role of The Officer in Rossini's The Barber of Seville and in 2018 performed the role of Sergeant in Handa Opera on Sydney Harbour in La bohème.

Olds has been an active member of the Opera Australia chorus since 2009. He has appeared in productions of Anna Bolena, Aida, Verdi Requiem, Parsifal, King Roger, Cavalleria rusticana, Pagliacci, Carmen, La bohème, The Love for Three Oranges, Simon Boccanegra, The Barber of Seville, La traviata, Lakmé, The Merry Widow, Macbeth, The Mikado, The Pirates of Penzance, Der Rosenkavalier and Fidelio.

In 2019, Olds will be performing alongside Jonas Kaufmann for the second time in concert performances of Andrea Chénier for Opera Australia and was selected as a Finalist for the Joan Sutherland and Richard Bonynge Foundation's third Sydney International Song Prize. Olds was also crowned the Winner of three sections at the 2019 Sydney Eisteddfod; Male Operatic Voices, Lieder (Open Age) and French and German art song.

In 2016, he was the recipient of both the Sanderson Award and the Hawaiian Performing Arts Festival Prize at Joan Sutherland and Richard Bonynge Foundation's Bel Canto Award Final and was a semi-finalist in the 2015 Sydney Eisteddfod Opera Scholarship.

In 2015, Olds performed the role of Count Almaviva in Mozart's The Marriage of Figaro for Rockdale Opera and was the Winner of the 34th National Liederfest, which secured him a scholarship at the Franz Schubert-Institut in Austria where he worked closely with Elly Ameling, Helmut Deutsch, Andreas Schmidt, Robert Holl, Rudolf Jansen and Werner Güra.

In 2013, Olds accepted a scholarship into the Artist Masters Programme at the Guildhall School of Music and Drama in London where he studied under Welsh Soprano Marilyn Rees. That same year, Olds toured the UK and France with Diva Opera again performing the role of The Officer in Rossini's The Barber of Seville and was a finalist in the Australian Music Foundation Awards at Wigmore Hall.

While in London, Olds performed the role of Betto in Puccini's Gianni Schicchi for St. Paul's Opera and the roles of Rocco (Fidelio), Leporello (Don Giovanni), and Dr. Dulcamara (L'elisir d'amore) for Guildhall Postgraduate Opera at the Milton Court Theatre.

Opera Australia

Fidelio – Chorus – 2009
The Pirates of Penzance – Samuel (Cover) / Chorus – 2010
Der Rosenkavalier – Chorus – 2010
La bohème – Chorus – 2011
Macbeth – Chorus – 2011
The Mikado – Chorus – 2011
Lakmé – Chorus – 2011
The Merry Widow – Chorus – 2011
La traviata – Chorus – 2012
The Barber of Seville – Officer – 2016
Carmen – Chorus – 2016
Simon Boccanegra – Chorus – 2016
La bohème – Chorus – 2016
Carmen – Chorus – 2016
The Love for Three Oranges – Chorus – 2016
Pagliacci – Chorus – 2017
Cavalleria rusticana – Chorus – 2017
King Roger – Chorus – 2017
Verdi Requiem – Chorus – 2017
Parsifal – Chorus – 2017
Carmen – Chorus – 2018
La bohème – Sergeant – 2018
Aida – Chorus – 2018
Anna Bolena – Chorus – 2019
Andrea Chénier – Chorus – 2019

Awards, achievements and roles

References

External links

1986 births
Living people
Singers from Sydney
People educated at Newington College
Sydney Conservatorium of Music alumni
21st-century Australian male opera singers
Operatic basses